Etielloides kogii is a species of snout moth in the genus Etielloides. It was described by Hiroshi Yamanaka in 1998 and is known from China and Japan.

References

Moths described in 1998
Phycitinae
Moths of Japan